Chakradhwaj (reigned 1460–1480) was a Khen ruler of the Kamata kingdom in Assam. He was the son of the founder of the dynasty, Niladhwaj, and was succeeded by his son Nilambar.

References

People from Assam
15th-century Indian monarchs
Year of birth missing
1480 deaths